Arthur Eidor Folke "Likenäsarn" Olsson (7 February 1926 – 12 October 2013) was a Swedish cross-country skier. He finished 11th in the 50 km event at the 1956 Winter Olympics and won a bronze medal in the 4 × 10 km relay at the 1954 World Championships. He received his nickname Likenäsarn after his first club IFK Likenäs.

Cross-country skiing results

Olympic Games

World Championships
 1 medal – (1 bronze)

References

Swedish male cross-country skiers
1926 births
2013 deaths
Cross-country skiers at the 1956 Winter Olympics
FIS Nordic World Ski Championships medalists in cross-country skiing